Defending champion Jim Courier defeated Stefan Edberg in a rematch of the previous year's final, 6–2, 6–1, 2–6, 7–5 to win the men's singles tennis title at the 1993 Australian Open.

Seeds

Andre Agassi (No. 9), because of bronchitis, withdrew from the tournament prior to the seedings.

Qualifying

Draw

Finals

Top half

Section 1

Section 2

Section 3

Section 4

Bottom half

Section 5

Section 6

Section 7

Section 8

References
General

Specific

External links
 1993 Australian Open – Men's draws and results at the International Tennis Federation

Mens singles
Australian Open (tennis) by year – Men's singles